Not To Disturb is a novel by the British author Muriel Spark. It was first published in 1971 by Macmillan.

The story is derived from a press report.

Plot summary
'A storm rages round the towers of the big house near Geneva. Behind the locked doors of the library, the Baron, the Baroness and their handsome young secretary are not to be disturbed. In the attic, the Baron's lunatic brother howls and hurls plates at his keeper. But in the staff quarters, all is under control. Under the personal supervision of Lister, the Baron's incomparable butler, the servants make their own, highly lucrative, preparations for the tragedy. The night is long, but morning will bring a *crime passionnel* of outstanding attraction and endless possibilities.'

Reception 
'[Muriel Spark's] new novel is an agile send-up of different kinds of popular fiction: detective stories, the Jeeves novels, and realistic tales about the servant problem. Read with these parallels in mind, Not to Disturb offers fresh laughter and acerbic insight into conventional ways of writing about the hypocrisies of master-servant relationships. Occasionally, the parody extends to other Gothic novels. ... Not to Disturb has the cleverness to entertain and the intelligence to provoke thought; but, finally, its philosophical mysteries look suspiciously like pretenses, and the book leaves the annoying as well as the stimulating after-effects of legerdemain.' The New York Times, 26  March 1972.

Martin Stannard records that 'Too many of the London reviews of Not To Disturb had been disappointing', and that in America it had had an 'indifferent reception'.

Notes

References 

1971 British novels
Novels by Muriel Spark
Novels set in Switzerland
Macmillan Publishers books